The Faculty of Business and Economics is a constituent body of Macquarie University. 
The Faculty offers both undergraduate and postgraduate coursework degrees as well as research degrees. The Faculty encompasses five departments, one school and one centre.
Their flagship course, the Bachelor of Commerce, received a 5 out 5 stars rating in The Good Universities Guide when it comes to above average incomes for graduates in first-time, full employment, particularly in business. The Faculty of Business and Economics of Macquarie University is accredited by AACSB International.

Undergraduate Study 

Students studying within the Faculty of Business and Economics have the opportunity to participate in business internships, go on exchange and complete electives from a wide range of programs.

Postgraduate Study 

The Faculty offers Masters programs across a wide range of disciplines.
The Faculty also offers online courses for international students or local students who have other commitments.

Areas of postgraduate study include:

Financial Risk
Working Futures
Ethics
Governance
Applied Finance
Business Excellence
Asian Economies
Economics Research

Research Groups within the Faculty of Business and Economics provide research and analysis services to a variety of corporations and government bodies.

Faculty Departments, Centres and Schools 

The Faculty of Business and Economics comprises one centre, four departments and one school:

Applied Finance Centre
Department of Accounting and Corporate Governance
Department of Applied Finance and Actuarial Studies
Department of Economics
Department of Marketing and Management
Macquarie Graduate School of Management (MGSM)

References

External links
 Macquarie University Faculty of Business and Economics Website

Business schools in Australia
Macquarie University